Edoardo Anton (7 January 1910 - 11 May 1986) was an Italian screenwriter and film director.

Background
Born in Rome as Edoardo Antonelli, Anton was the son of the playwright and journalist Luigi Antonelli.  He entered the cinema industry in mid-thirties and soon became a prolific screenwriter specialized in comedy films. His work as filmmaker is marginal, mainly confined to the co-direction of a few international co-productions; the only work entirely attributable to him is Il lupo della frontiera.

Selected filmography

Writer

Director

References

External links
 

1910 births
1986 deaths
20th-century Italian screenwriters
Italian film directors
Writers from Rome
Italian male screenwriters
20th-century Italian male writers